The Dodge City Legend was a professional basketball franchise located in Dodge City, Kansas in the United States Basketball League, a minor league that played in the spring. The Legend won three USBL titles, in 2000, its first season, 2003 and in 2005.

The Legend drew fans from surrounding towns, such as Garden City and Liberal.  They played their home games at the Dodge City Civic Center.

The Legend's colors were purple, black and silver. The nickname came from the cowtown history of Dodge City, which has been immortalized in numerous feature films and the television program, Gunsmoke.

Notable players
 Kenny Gregory
 Darrin Hancock
 Jamario Moon
 Jimmy King
 Oliver Miller
 Sun Mingming
 Roy Tarpley
 David Bell
 Chad LaCross
 Ricky de Aragon

External links 
Dodge City Legend Official site
USBL League Website
Dodge City Legend - Discussion Forum

United States Basketball League teams
Basketball teams in Kansas
Dodge City, Kansas
Basketball teams established in 2000
Basketball teams disestablished in 2007
2000 establishments in Kansas
2007 disestablishments in Kansas